Casper & the Cookies is an American rock and pop band from Athens, Georgia, United States.

History 
Multi-instrumentalist and singer Jason NeSmith (pronounced "KNEE-smith," no relation to Michael Nesmith of the Monkees), began using the pseudonym Casper Fandango in 1996 as a moniker for his solo four-track recordings.  NeSmith was given the name by fellow Atlanta musician David Dault while playing together in the band Feyerabend.

Casper & the Cookies released two DIY cassettes in the late 1990s, originally as Casper Fandango & the Knees and subsequently Casper Fandango & His Tiny Sick Tears.

The Cookies came into existence in 1998 as NeSmith's live band.  They have three CDs released on Happy Happy Birthday To Me Records, Oh! (2004), The Optimist's Club (2006), and Modern Silence (2009). After many lineup changes the band consists of NeSmith, Kay Stanton, Davy Gibbs, and AJ Griffin.

NeSmith was a member of Of Montreal for the Satanic Panic in the Attic tour of 2004 and some of the Sunlandic Twins tour of 2005, eventually leaving to focus on his own band. (Kay and Jason are also in Supercluster, the side project of Vanessa Briscoe Hay of Pylon.) NeSmith has also been a member of Kenny Howes & the Yeah!, Orange Hat, The Visitations, The Late BP Helium and The Sunshine Fix.  He also owns and operates a commercial recording facility, Bel*Air Studio.

Casper & the Cookies served as the backing band for Daniel Johnston at the 2007 Athens Pop Fest.  Also in 2007, The Cookies went on a nationwide tour supporting The Apples in Stereo.

Members

Current
Jason NeSmith (aka Casper Fandango)
Kay Stanton
Davy Gibbs
AJ Griffin

Past
Christo Harris
Ben Spraker
Kenny Howes
Phil Stockman
Paul Walker
Tim Schreiber
Suzanne Allison
Bryan Poole (aka The Late BP Helium)
Peter Alvanos
Jason Gonzales
Gregory Sanders
Joe Rowe
Lucas Jensen
Jim Hicks

Discography

Albums 
Consumer (cassette; as Casper Fandango & the Knees) – Lookit Meee! – 1996
How's Your Hand? (cassette; as Casper Fandango & His Tiny Sick Tears) – Lookit Meee! – 1997
How's Your Hand? (CD; as Casper Fandango & His Tiny Sick Tears) Lookit Meee! / AAJ – 2000
Oh! (CD) – Happy Happy Birthday to Me Records [HHBTM] / Waikiki Record – 2004/ 2005 (Japan)
The Optimist's Club – (CD/LP) – HHBTM / People in a Position to Know {PIAPTK] – 2006 and Waikiki Record – 2008
Modern Silence – (CD/LP) – HHBTM / People in a Position to Know {PIAPTK] – 2009
Volatile and Erogenous: The Best of Casper & The Cookies – (CD) HHBTM / People In A Position to Know – 2011 (The album was given away for free on the Facebook page of the band and custom made by drummer Gregory Sanders) 
Ice Mattress – (digital only release) – Self-Released – 2011
Dingbats – (LP/CD/cassette) – Wild Kindness Records – 2014

Singles and EPs 
The Band That Shouted Love at the Heart of the World (CD-r) – Lookit Meee! – 2004
Overly Optimistic (CD-r) – HHBTM – 2006
3 ½ Stars (CD-r) – HHBTM – 2007
"Power Stupid" (split with Keith John Adams) 8”  – PIAPTK – 2007
"Jennifer’s House" / “Huff” (split with Marbles) 7” – HHBTM – 2007
"Kiss Me Beneath the Christmas Tree" (digital only) – HHBTM – 2007

References

External links 
 [ All Music Guide entry on Casper & the Cookies]
 Casper & the Cookies website

American pop rock music groups
Musical groups established in 1998
The Elephant 6 Recording Company artists
Musical collectives
Indie pop groups from Georgia (U.S. state)